Faxton is an abandoned village and chapelry in the county of Northamptonshire in England. Nearby are the villages of Old, Lamport and Mawsley and the Northampton & Lamport Railway.

It is believed that the name Faxton comes from the Scandinavian Fakr and the Anglo-Saxon tun, meaning Fakr's Farm. This would indicate that Faxton grew from a Viking or Norse settler's farmstead and therefore would date from approximately the 9th century

The Domesday Book, naming Faxton as the Manor of Fextone, notes that the population was of approximately 60 to 80 people. The village is documented as having consisted of a church, a rectory, a hall, an aviary, almshouses and a number of ponds. Lady Danvers founded the parish's almshouses for four persons and, six years later, Jane Kemsey bequeathed £100 to it.

Archaeological evidence has been found of settlement at Faxton as early as around 1200.

It has been said that in an attempt to escape the plague in London in 1665, a family relocated to Faxton with their servants, one of whom carried the fatal disease which spread and almost wiped out the village. However, this tale is disproved by comparing the number of householders recorded in the hearth tax lists for Faxton in years before and after that date. 30 householders were listed in 1662, but 34 were recorded for the year ending 25 March 1674.

Former residents have recalled that Faxton could only be reached by horse-drawn vehicles, as none of the roads leading to it were made up to accommodate motor vehicles; they considered that to be a major factor in the decline of the village.

The parish church of St Denis suffered extensive vandalism during the early 20th century. It ceased to be used for public worship in 1939 and was demolished in 1958.

There is now just one house standing on this remote hilltop location, overlooking the rolling farmland.

The Northamptonshire Record Office holds the christening, marriage and burial registers for the parish.

Sir Augustine Nichols (1559-1616)

Faxton's most famous resident was Sir Augustine Nichols, a judge of the Court of Common Pleas under James I of England. He was a Knight of the Bath, born in Faxton in 1559; he died in 1616.

In 1610, the Manor of Kibworth, Leicestershire was jointly granted to Augustine, Anthony Shugborough and John Smith after Ambrose Dudley, the Earl of Warwick, died without an heir. It is not clear what happened to the manor immediately after this, but by 1632 the manor was being held by the Berrige family.

Judge Nichols had a clerk working for him. He was Thomas Dudley, a relation of the Nichols family. In 1627 Thomas Dudley, with his wife, daughter Anne, and her husband Simon Bradstreet, sailed for America. Dudley became Governor of Massachusetts as did Bradstreet later. Anne Bradstreet became America's first female poet and is still thought to be one of its finest. Her poem To my dear and loving husband was set to music by Leonard Bernstein and performed at the inauguration of President Jimmy Carter.

A memorial to Augustine was positioned inside the parish church but it was smashed during the church's demolition in 1958. The Victoria and Albert Museum in London retrieved the pieces and spent three years restoring it to its former splendour.

References

External links
An 1887 map of Faxton from British History Online. 
When is a Village? - an article on the history of Faxton.
New Book on Faxton - Bryan Holden's new book about Faxton.

Former populated places in Northamptonshire